La Dueña (English title: Lady Owner) is a Mexican telenovela produced by Florinda Meza for Televisa in 1995.

Starring Angelica Rivera, Francisco Gattorno, Cynthia Klitbo and Eduardo Santamarina.

Plot 
Life smiles at Regina Villarreal (Angélica Rivera), a young and beautiful woman who inherits a fortune from her deceased parents. Regina lives with her aunt Berenice Villarreal Vda. de Castro (Norma Herrera), whom she loves as if she were her own mother, her unbearable cousin, Laura Castro Villarreal (Cynthia Klitbo), and Laura’s inseparable nana, Martina (Josefina Echánove).

Laura envies her cousin and believes that she is more deserving of all that Regina has, so she decides to make Regina suffer. Her first move is to seduce Regina's fiancé, Mauricio (Eduardo Santamarina), who is only after Regina’s money. On her wedding day, Mauricio leaves Regina at the altar, which shatters her heart and makes it grow cold and bitter.

Regina moves to one of her properties, Los Cascabeles ("The Bells"), a ranch far away from the capital. She becomes a resentful and indomitable woman, “La Dueña” ("The Owner"), as her employees call her, and her reputation earns her the nickname “Víbora” (“Viper”) from the locals.

She meets José María (Francisco Gattorno), owner of the neighboring hacienda Los Encinos. Both fall for each other, but José María does not reveal his feelings for her out of fear of getting hurt in a relationship again.

Around this time, Berenice, Laura, and Martina move to Los Cascabeles. Macario, the foreman, is in love with Regina, and he and Laura scheme to keep Regina and José María apart.  Laura has fallen in love with José María, because of it, Regina will become once again a target for her cousin even though La Dueña will not let anyone steal the heart of her beloved.

Cast 
 
Angélica Rivera as Regina Villarreal Montenegro "La Dueña"
Francisco Gattorno as José María Cortéz
Cynthia Klitbo as Laura Castro Villarreal
Eduardo Santamarina as Mauricio Padilla
Norma Herrera as Berenice Villarreal Vda. de Castro
Rosita Quintana as Emma de Cortéz
Salvador Sánchez as Macario Robles
Raúl Ramírez as Severiano Cortéz
Josefina Echánove as Martina
Miguel Pizarro as Octavio Acosta
Aylín Mújica as Fabiola Hernández
Georgina Pedret as Patricia Castelo
Paty Díaz as Blanquita López
Jorge del Campo as Don Anselmo Morales
Marco Uriel as Ismael Andrade
Eugenia Avendaño as Silvia Tamayo de Hernández
Mario Casillas as Manuel Hernández
Eduardo López Rojas as Gregorio "Goyo" Mendoza
Gilberto Román as Leandro Rentería
Mariana Karr as Julieta Rentería
Lucía Guilmáin as Consuelo López
Yula Pozo as Armida
Claudia Eliza Aguilar as Aurelia
Roberto Ramírez Garza as Father Abel Guitrón
Jesús Arriaga as Lucio
Horacio Vera as Fortunato
Antonio Miguel as Father Juan Suárez
Gerardo Gallardo as Omar
Maickol Segura as Chuy
Viridiana Segura as Lolita
José Antonio Ferral as Ezequiel García
Claudia Cañedo as Sonia Fuentes
Vicky Rodel as Aída
Simone Brook as Dora Montes
Daniela Luján as Regina Villarreal (child)
Katalina Krueger as Laura Castro (child)
Isaías Mino as Syndic municipal Atilino Salazar
Arturo Muñoz as Ezequiel's friend
Luis Reynoso as Comandante Jesús Reyna
Dolores Salomón as Paquita
Ángeles Balvanera as Panchita
Enio Mejía as Don Agustín
Juan Antonio Gómez as Bernardo Martínez
Beatriz Monroy as Gossipy woman #1
Linda Elizabeth as Gossipy woman #2
Fernanda Franco as Gossipy woman #3
Alea Yólotl as Chela
Franco Javier as Salomón
Gabriela Cuéllar as Juana
Claudia Benedetti
Dulce Esperanza
Lorena Álvarez

Awards

References

External links

1995 telenovelas
Mexican telenovelas
1995 Mexican television series debuts
1995 Mexican television series endings
Television shows set in Mexico City
Televisa telenovelas
Spanish-language telenovelas